G. V. Sudhakar Naidu is an actor who played roles in Telugu films. He became a director in 2008 and has directed two Telugu films. His first film was Hero released in 2008 with Nitin Reddy and Bhavana. His second film as a director got chance to work with Srikanth was Ranga The Donga released in 2010. He also contested for Gajuwaka constituency from congress in 2014 general elections.

He is more well known in the Telugu film industry as G. V. rather than  Sudhakar Naidu.

Career
G. V. Sudhakar Naidu of Hero and Ranga - The Donga fame has wowed Nana Patekar and Anil Kapoor with its history. Many films from Tollywood have been remade into Hindi recently. It is an achievement of sorts for a Telugu movie maker. Sudhakar's upward mobility to Bollywood hinges on the fact that the film will also see Hema Malini and Rekha in important lead cast. Telugu movies have had a successful run in that industry for years now.

Filmography

As director
 Hero (2008)
 Ranga The Donga (2010)

As actor

Telugu

Anthapuram (1998)
Baalaram (2000)
Ayodhya Ramayya (2000)
Itlu Sravani Subramanyam (2001)
Seema Simham (2002)
Vasu (2002)
Indra (2002)
Okkadu (2003)
Simhadri (2003)
Samba (2004)
Andhrawala (2004)
Athanokkade (2005)
Happy (2006)
Ranam (2006)
Asadhyudu (2006)
Pokiri (2006)
Aadavari Matalaku Arthale Verule (2007)
Chirutha (2007)
Kantri (2008)
Ranga The Donga (2010)
Oosaravelli (2011)
Sudigadu (2012) 
Okkadine (2013)
Chandee (2013)
Yevadu (2014)
Legend (2014)
Poga (2014)
Dictator (2016)
Sarrainodu (2016)
Jakkana (2016)
Hyper (2016)
Appatlo Okadundevadu (2016)
Jaya Janaki Nayaka (2017)
Vinaya Vidheya Rama (2019)

Tamil
Anthapuram (1999)
Thavasi (2001)
Pachchak Kuthira (2006)
Pokkiri (2007)
Kuruvi (2008)

Kannada
Durgi (2004)

Hindi
Wanted (2009)
R... Rajkumar (2013)
Bhojpuri 

Nirahua no 1 (2009)

References

Indian male film actors
Living people
Year of birth missing (living people)